Joseph Henry Nicholls (8 March 1905 – 20 June 1973) was a professional footballer who played for teams including Darlaston, Northfleet United, Tottenham Hotspur and Bristol Rovers.

Football career 
Nicholls initially trained as a bricklayer, but joined the Grenadier Guards in 1922, where he became the heavyweight boxing champion of his battalion. In 1924 he had a trial with Notts County but without success. He went on to play for Darlaston before joining the Tottenham Hotspur nursery club Northfleet United. The goalkeeper joined the White Hart Lane club in 1927 and featured in 129 matches in all competitions. In 1936 he moved to Bristol Rovers and played a further 112 games by 1939.

References

External links 
Photo of Nicholls Retrieved 20 February 2009

1905 births
1973 deaths
People from Carlton, Nottinghamshire
Footballers from Nottinghamshire
English footballers
Association football goalkeepers
Darlaston Town F.C. players
Northfleet United F.C. players
Tottenham Hotspur F.C. players
Bristol Rovers F.C. players
Grenadier Guards soldiers
Military personnel from Nottinghamshire
English Football League players
20th-century British Army personnel